William Edwin Burwell (March 27, 1895 – June 11, 1973) was an American professional baseball player, manager and coach.

Early life 
Burwell was born in Jarbalo, Kansas.He won 239 minor league games during a 22-year playing career. He pitched for all or parts of 12 straight seasons (1923–34) for the Indianapolis Indians of the American Association.

Career 
During his active career, he was a right-handed relief pitcher in Major League Baseball for the St. Louis Browns and Pittsburgh Pirates. In 70 MLB games, six as a starting pitcher, he won nine games and lost eight, with a 4.37 earned run average. He posted six saves and one complete game, allowing 253 hits and 79 bases on balls, with 49 strikeouts, in 218 innings pitched.

He also fashioned a lengthy post-pitching career as a minor league manager (including two seasons, 1945–46, as skipper of the Indianapolis franchise) and Major League coach. He worked in the latter role for the Boston Red Sox (1944) and Pittsburgh Pirates (1947–48; 1958–62). While serving as pitching coach on Danny Murtaugh's staff, Burwell was a member of the Pirates' 1960 world championship team.

Burwell was acting manager of the Pirates for the final game of the 1947 season, after player-manager Billy Herman resigned with one game remaining. Under Burwell, the Pirates defeated the Cincinnati Reds, 7–0. He also was a longtime scout and roving minor-league coach for the Pirates.

While working as pitching instructor in the Pirate organization in 1949, Burwell was instrumental to the development of pitcher Vern Law, then toiling for the Class B Davenport Pirates of the Illinois–Indiana–Iowa League. Burwell taught the 19-year-old Law how to change speeds and throw the change-up. Law later cited Burwell as the coach who most helped him during his time in the minor leagues.

Burwell died at age 78 in Ormond Beach, Florida, and is buried in nearby Daytona Beach.

References

External links
 
 Playing, cosching and managing record from Retrosheet
 

1895 births
1973 deaths
Baseball coaches from Kansas
Baseball players from Kansas
Boston Red Sox coaches
Clinton Pilots players
Columbus Senators players
Crookston Pirates players
Fort Wayne Chiefs players
Indianapolis Indians managers
Indianapolis Indians players
Joplin Miners players
Louisville Colonels (minor league) managers
Major League Baseball pitchers
Major League Baseball pitching coaches
Minneapolis Millers (baseball) players
People from Leavenworth County, Kansas
Pittsburgh Pirates coaches
Pittsburgh Pirates players
Pittsburgh Pirates scouts
Rockford Wakes players
Rock Island Islanders players
St. Louis Browns players
Terre Haute Tots players
Topeka Savages players
People from Ormond Beach, Florida
Mason City Claydiggers players
Elgin Watch Makers players